Jennifer Lauret (born 1 January 1980 in Toulouse, France) is an actress in French language cinema. She has starred in several television series and movies.

Biography
Lauret began her career in 1986 as a child actress in a television commercial for Barbie dolls, followed in 1989 by a secondary role in the television series Marc et Sophie, and in theater with actors such as Patrick Chesnais.

Her career finally took off with the role of Penelope in Patrick Braoudé's Génial, mes parents divorcent (Brilliant, my parents are divorced). She then won numerous roles on television, most notably Une famille formidable (A marvelous family) and Julie Lescaut with the respective roles of  Frédérique Beaumont and Sarah (the eldest daughter Julie Lescaut).

She has given birth to four daughters, Shaana, Carla, Anna, and Nell.

Filmography

Movies
Génial, mes parents divorcent (1991) by Patrick Braoudé : Pénélope
Amour et confusions (1997) by Patrick Braoudé : Girl in love
Une femme très très très amoureuse (1997) by Ariel Zeitoun : Judith

Telefilms
2 bis, rue de la Combine (1992)
Cœur à prendre (1994) : Valérie Bouquet
Passé sous silence (1994) : Cécile jeune
Bonne fête papa (1997) : Marion
La Fine équipe (1997) : Vanessa
Une leçon particulière (1997) : Vanessa
Robinson Crusoé (2003) : Isabella at 20 years old
Camping Paradis (2006): Ariane Leroy
Camping Paradis 2 (2008): Ariane Leroy

Series
Marc et Sophie (1988–1990) : Niece in the concierge
Hôtel de police - episode Flic, impair et casse (1990)
Une famille formidable (1992- present) : Frédérique Beaumont
Julie Lescaut (1992-2014) : Sarah
La Rivière Espérance (1995) (feuilleton) : Virginie at 13 years old
Commissaire Moulin - episode Le petit fugitif (2006): Julie Jonquet

References

External links
 
  Jennifer Lauret web site
  Interview by La cité des Artistes

Living people
1980 births
20th-century French actresses
21st-century French actresses
Actresses from Toulouse
French child actresses
French film actresses
French television actresses